Suicide Cliff is a cliff above Marpi Point Field near the northern tip of Saipan, Northern Mariana Islands, which achieved historic significance late in World War II.

Also known as Laderan Banadero, it is a location where numerous Japanese civilians and Imperial Japanese Army soldiers took their own lives by jumping to their deaths in July 1944 in order to avoid capture by the United States. Japanese propaganda had emphasized brutal American treatment of Japanese, citing the American mutilation of Japanese war dead and claiming U.S. soldiers were bloodthirsty and without morals. Many Japanese feared the "American devils raping and devouring Japanese women and children." The precise number of suicides there is not known. One eyewitness said he saw “hundreds of bodies” below the cliff, while elsewhere, numbers in the thousands have been cited.

By 1976, a park and peace memorial was in place and the location had become a pilgrimage destination, particularly for visitors from Japan. In that year,  of the site were listed on the US National Register of Historic Places.

The cliff is, along with the airfield and Banzai Cliff, a coastal cliff where suicides also took place, part of the National Historic Landmark District Landing Beaches; Aslito/Isley Field; & Marpi Point, Saipan Island, designated in 1985.

See also 
 National Register of Historic Places listings in the Northern Mariana Islands
Banzai Cliff

References 

Cliffs
Historic district contributing properties in the Northern Mariana Islands
World War II sites of the United States
World War II on the National Register of Historic Places in the Northern Mariana Islands
Saipan
Cliffs of Oceania
Landforms of the Northern Mariana Islands